William Seymour, 3rd Duke of Somerset (17 April 165212 December 1671) was the son of Henry Seymour, Lord Beauchamp, and Mary Capell. As both his father and two elder uncles had predeceased him, he succeeded to the dukedom on the death of his grandfather William Seymour.

He died in 1671, unmarried and childless and was succeeded by his paternal uncle John Seymour.

References

1652 births
1671 deaths
503
William Seymour, 03rd Duke of Somerset
Marquesses of Hertford (1641 creation)